"One More Time" is a song by Richard Marx which he wrote for Laura Pausini. Later Marx recorded the song for his sixth studio album, Days in Avalon. Pausini's version was originally released in 1999 for the movie Message in a Bottle.

The song is available on both Pausini's greatest hits compilations, "E ritorno da te" and "20 - The Greatest Hits".

The song was performed live during Pausini's third world tour. Live versions were included on Pausini's first DVD. There is a little-known video clip of an acoustic performance of the song included on Pausini's now-discontinued Video Collection.

Music video

A music video of the song was not recorded, however, the acoustic version present on Pausini's discontinued VHS "Video Collection 1993–1999" is considered to be the official one. It shows only Pausini in a simple plan, with a black dress, then in front of a white piano.

Track listing
CD single – "One More Time – Music from and Inspired by the Motion Picture Message in a Bottle"
 "One More Time" – 4:22
 "Don't" (performed by Yve.n.Adam) – 3:45
 "Somewhere in the Middle" (performed by Nine Sky Wonder) – 3:58

Covers
Myriam Hernandez performed a cover of the song in Spanish for their album "+ Y Más..." in 2000

Personnel
Music personnel
 Richard Marx – composer
 David Foster – keyboards
 Felipe Elgueta – synthesizer programming
 Dean Parks – guitars
 William Ross – orchestra arrangement

Production personnel
 David Foster – producer
 Humberto Gatica – mixing
 Felipe Elgueta – engineer
 David Reitzas – additional engineer

Charts

References

1999 singles
Pop ballads
Richard Marx songs
Songs written by Richard Marx
Songs written for films
1999 songs
Song recordings produced by David Foster